Barry Goudreau is the only studio album by American guitarist and former Boston member Barry Goudreau. The album features Goudreau's bandmates with Boston Brad Delp on lead vocals, Sib Hashian on drums and Fran Cosmo (who would later join Boston in 1991), the album displays a sound very similar to that of Boston's first two releases, Boston (1976) and Don't Look Back (1978). However, neither this album nor any of Goudreau's subsequent releases with other acts (Orion the Hunter and RTZ) proved to be as commercially successful as his work with Boston. The album was released in 1980 and is Goudreau's only solo album. The song "Dreams" was released as a single in 1980, nearly cracking the USBillboard Hot 100 (#103, October 1980). It still receives airplay on classic rock radio stations, as does "Mean Woman Blues".

Cash Box said of "Dreams" that it is "as melodic and hook-filled as anything by Boston."  Record World called it a "powerhouse rocker" and said that "Frenetic guitar leads burn over the bulldozer rhythm."

Track listing 

Side One (A)

 "Hard Luck" (Barry Goudreau, Brad Delp) - 3:37
 "Nothin' to Lose" (Fran Cosmo) – 4:01
 "What's a Fella to Do?" (Goudreau, Delp) – 4:29
 "Mean Woman Blues" (Goudreau, Delp) – 3:53

Side Two (B)

 "Leavin' Tonight" (Cosmo) – 3:25
 "Dreams" (Goudreau) – 3:32
 "Life Is What We Make It" (Goudreau, Delp) – 3:11
 "Sailin' Away" (Goudreau) – 1:48
 "Cold Cold World" (Cosmo) – 4:55

Personnel 
 Barry Goudreau - lead guitar, vocals, bass, keyboards
 Brad Delp - lead vocals on tracks "Hard Luck", "What's a Fella to Do?", "Mean Woman Blues", "Dreams, "Life Is What We Make It" and "Sailin' Away"
 Fran Cosmo - lead vocals on tracks "Nothin' to Lose", "Leavin' Tonight" and "Cold Cold World"
 Sib Hashian - drums, percussion
 Jesse Erlich - cello
 Joy Lyle - violin
 David Schwartz - viola
 Sid Sharp - violin, concertmaster

Production 
 Produced By John Boylan & Barry Goudreau
 Engineered By Paul Grupp
 Assistant Engineers: Ed Cherney, Phil Jamtaas, Russ Martin
 Mastering: Steve Hoffman
 CD Preparation: Kevin Gray

Charts 
Albums - Billboard (United States)

Singles - Billboard (United States)

References 

1980 debut albums
Albums produced by John Boylan (record producer)
Pop albums by American artists